Senator Read may refer to:

Members of the United States Senate
George Read (American politician, born 1733) (1733–1798), U.S. Senator from Delaware from 1789 to 1793
Jacob Read (1752–1816), U.S. Senator from South Carolina from 1795 to 1801

United States state senate members
Almon Heath Read (1790–1844), Pennsylvania State Senate
Gilbert E. Read (1822–1898), Michigan State Senate
John Milton Read (1842–1881), Wisconsin State Senate
John Read (lawyer) (1769–1854), Pennsylvania State Senate
Seth Read (1746–1797), Massachusetts State Senate
Thomas Read (politician) (1881–1962), Michigan State Senate
William B. Read (1817–1880), Kentucky State Senate

See also
Senator Reed (disambiguation)
Senator Reid (disambiguation)